The News-Examiner is a newspaper in Montpelier, Idaho publishing since the 1930s and now owned by Adams Publishing Group's news division, the largest paper of which is the Herald Journal of Logan, Utah.

References

Newspapers published in Idaho
Weekly newspapers published in the United States